Tim Geitner is a former state representative from El Paso County, Colorado. A Republican, Geitner represented Colorado House of Representatives District 19, which encompassed the El Paso County communities of Black Forest, Calhan, Ellicott, Gleneagle, Monument, Peyton, Ramah, and Woodmoor. He served on the House Education Committee, the House Legislative Council Committee, and the Legislative Interim Committee on School Finance.

Elections
Geitner was first elected as a state representative in the 2018 general elections. In that election, he defeated his Democratic opponent, winning 75.94% of the vote.

In the 2020 elections, Geitner ran unopposed in the primary and defeated his Democratic Party opponent in the general election, winning 48,521 votes to his opponent's 16,198.

In February 2022, Geitner announced that he was not running for re-election in 2022, and he resigned his house seat effective October 7, 2022.

References

External links
 Campaign website
 State House website

21st-century American politicians
Living people
Republican Party members of the Colorado House of Representatives
People from El Paso County, Colorado
University of Central Florida alumni
Year of birth missing (living people)